Riz may refer to:

Places
 Riz, Iran, a city in Bushehr Province, Iran
 Riz, Ardabil, a village in Ardabil Province, Iran
 Riz District, a district in Bushehr Province, Iran
 Riz Rural District, a rural district in Riz District
 Riz e lenjan, a city in Isfahan Province, Iran
 Riz Kan, a village in Fars Province, Iran
 Riz Poultry Company, a company town and village in Semnan Province, Iran
 Bar Riz, a city in Kerman Province, Iran

People
 Riz (singer) (born 1986), Malaysian entertainer
 Riz Ahmed (born 1982), British film actor
 Riz Khan (born 1962), British television news reporter
 Riz Maslen, English electronic music artist
 Riz Ortolani (1926–2014), Italian film composer
 Martin Riz (born 1980), Italian ski mountaineer

Other uses
 RIZ (company), a Croatian electronics company

See also
 Riz Ab (disambiguation)